Spring Fever may refer to:

 Spring fever, an experience of restlessness or romantic feelings, associated with the onset of spring

Film
 Spring Fever (1919 film), an American silent short film directed by Hal Roach
 Spring Fever (1927 film), an American silent film directed by Edward Sedgwick
 Spring Fever (1965 film) (Fiebre de primavera), a 1965 Argentine film directed by Enrique Carreras
 Spring Fever (1981 film), a Taiwanese film directed by Su Yueh-ho
 Spring Fever (1982 film), an American film directed by Joseph L. Scanlan
 Spring Fever (2009 film), a Chinese film directed by Lou Ye
 Cabin Fever 2: Spring Fever, a 2009 American film directed by Ti West

Literature
 Spring Fever (novel), a comic novel by P. G. Wodehouse
 Spring Fever (manga), a Japanese manga anthology by Yugi Yamada

Music
 "Spring Fever" (song), by Loretta Lynn, 1978
 "Spring Fever", a song by Elvis Presley from Girl Happy
 Spring Fever, a 1975 album by Rick Derringer
 Springfever, a 1976 album by Joachim Kühn
 "Spring Fever", a 2021 song by Sub Urban (musician)
 "spring fever", a 202X song by Ulyara Pedraza

Television episodes
 "Spring Fever" (Bear in the Big Blue House)
 "Spring Fever" (Last of the Summer Wine)
 "Spring Fever!" (The Raccoons)